Park View is a census-designated place (CDP) in Scott County, Iowa, United States. The population was 2,389 at the 2010 census.

Geography
Park View is located at  (41.693764, −90.541373).

Demographics

As of the census of 2000, there were 2,169 people, 758 households, and 580 families residing in the CDP. The racial makeup of the CDP was 96.96% White, 0.55% African American, 0.32% Native American, 0.60% Asian, 0.55% from other races, and 1.01% from two or more races. Hispanic or Latino of any race were 1.15% of the population.

There were 758 households, out of which 49.2% had children under the age of 18 living with them, 62.0% were married couples living together, 10.6% had a female householder with no husband present, and 23.4% were non-families. 17.4% of all households were made up of individuals, and 2.2% had someone living alone who was 65 years of age or older. The average household size was 2.86 and the average family size was 3.25.

In the CDP, the population was spread out, with 33.6% under the age of 18, 9.8% from 18 to 24, 34.8% from 25 to 44, 18.3% from 45 to 64, and 3.6% who were 65 years of age or older. The median age was 29 years. For every 100 females, there were 104.0 males. For every 100 females age 18 and over, there were 100.8 males.

The median income for a household in the CDP was $51,000, and the median income for a family was $55,341. Males had a median income of $39,152 versus $27,456 for females. The per capita income for the CDP was $18,649. None of the families and 1.0% of the population were living below the poverty line, including no under eighteens and none of those over 64.

Education 
Park View is part of the North Scott School District. Elementary-aged students from the area attend Neil Armstrong Elementary. Junior high and high school students attend the North Scott Junior High and North Scott High School located in Eldridge.

Government 
Park View is unincorporated at this time.  It is primarily governed by the Scott County Government.

Notable people

References

Census-designated places in Scott County, Iowa
Census-designated places in Iowa
Cities in the Quad Cities